Milan Biševac (born 31 August 1983) is a Serbian former footballer who played as centre-back. In international competition, he has represented the Serbia national team.

Club career

Early career

Biševac started his football career when he was at BASK in 2001. Biševac had been at OFK Beograd, but the club let him go because it was not impressed with his talent. At BASK, he established himself in the starting XI, scoring five goals in 52 appearances. In 2003, he left BASK for FK Bežanija, where he scored once in 15 appearances. After half a season at Bežanija, he joined FK Železnik after their coach was impressed by his play and decided to sign him. At Železnik, Biševac helped the club to a third place finish in the league.

Red Star Belgrade
In the summer transfer window, Biševac joined Serbian Red Star Belgrade for a reported fee of €500,000. He made his European debut when he came on as a late substitute in a 2–2 draw against Swiss side Young Boys in the first leg. In the second leg, Red Star Belgrade advanced to the next round, winning 3–0, where Biševac played the full 90 minutes. With Red Star's elimination from the UEFA Champions League, he also made his UEFA Cup debut in a first-round loss against Russian side Zenit Saint Petersburg. At Red Star, he won his place in the first team in defence and scored once in 24 appearances. The club, however, was unable to win the title, losing to rivals Partizan, though in the following season, the team won the title. In the UEFA Cup campaign, Biševac played all the club's matches. He continued to be in the first team for the club until he left Serbia for France.

Lens
In the summer transfer window, Biševac joined Lens; he remained, however, at Red Star until January due to remaining issues in Serbia. After his move, he joined up his Serbian national teammate Nenad Kovačević. On 3 February 2007, Biševac played his first Ligue 1 match for Lens against Valenciennes. In the second half of the season, Biševac played only a handful of matches after suffering from a back injury. The following season, Biševac established himself in the first team. On 21 January 2008, he scored his first goal in his French career in a 3–0 win over his future club Lyon. In a 1–1 draw against Toulouse, he also set up a goal for striker Loïc Rémy. During the season, the club would play in European games, where Biševac featured regularly. Lens, however, were relegated at the end of the season.

Valenciennes
On 4 July 2008, Biševac signed a four-year contract with Valenciennes for an undisclosed fee, believed to be in the region of €3 million. On his move, he was seen a replacement for central defenders Éric Chelle and Abdeslam Ouaddou. In the opening game of the domestic season, Biševac made his debut in a 1–0 win over Saint-Étienne. In his first season, he went on to make 37 appearances, where his one absence was due to a suspension after picking up a fifth league yellow card.

The following season, Biševac was named captain of the team, replacing Rafael Schmitz, who was his partner in central defence partnership during the season. On 26 September 2009, he scored his first goal in a 3–2 win over Marseille. In a match against Montpellier on 7 November 2009, Biševac suffered an injury on his foot, forcing him to miss two weeks of action. Several weeks later, he made his return in a 3–1 win over Monaco on 4 December 2009. On 10 April 2010, he scored his second goal of the season in a 2–1 loss against Monaco.

During the summer transfer window, Biševac was linked a move away from Valenciennes, with the likes of Galatasaray and Fenerbahçe, Paris Saint-Germain and other European clubs all tracking him; no offers were ever made. The next season, he maintained his captaincy and his first team place as he stayed for another season at Valenciennes. On 29 January 2011, he scored his first goal of the season in a 2–1 win over Lyon, scoring from the penalty spot and his second came in a 3–0 win over Brest. On 9 April 2011, Biševac received a red card after receiving second booking offence in a 1–1 draw against Nancy. At the end of the season, the club finished 12th place in the league.

Paris Saint-Germain

In the summer transfer window, Paris Saint-Germain renewed their interests in signing Biševac. On 25 July 2011, he signed a three-year contract with PSG for an undisclosed fee. On his move, he spoke out about feeling under pressure and said, "I got to know this at Red Star Belgrade, where fans could enter the dressing room to demand us to win. I'm not afraid of pressure. I prefer for there to be pressure, I am more focused and I perform better."

In the opening game of the season, Biševac made his debut in a 1–0 loss against Lorient, playing 90 minutes. He soon became a regular player in the team, playing the first four games to start the season. After the arrival of centre back Diego Lugano, however, he lost his first team status. Incoming manager Carlo Ancelotti then shifted Biševac from central defence to right back, finding himself competing with natural right backs Christophe Jallet and Ceará. The arrival of Alex from Chelsea sent Biševac further down the pecking order at centre back. On 28 January 2012, Biševac opened his goalscoring account for PSG, netting the only goal in a 0–1 victory away to Brest. In the same month, he was awarded UNFP Player of the Month due to his impressive performances. He went on to make more appearances for the club, reverting to his nature centre back position towards the end of the season.

At the start of the following season, PSG signed centre back Thiago Silva from Milan, leading to speculation that Biševac would leave the club, with Lyon confirming their interest in signing him. After rumours of the bid spread, PSG initially agreed only to sell him if Lyon agreed to send right back Anthony Réveillère in the opposite direction. PSG were motivated to sell him in order to free up one of the four prohibited non-EU spots after the club signed Brazilian winger Lucas from São Paulo. Just days after Biševac joined Lyon, league rivals Marseille stated their intent to sign him, but owner Margarita Louis-Dreyfus refused, stating the club didn't have enough money.

Lyon
In the summer of 2012, Biševac joined Lyon for a transfer fee of €2.75 million plus bonuses on a four-year contract. He made his debut coming on as a substitute in a 4–1 win over Troyes. He then played the full 90 minutes in the next game in a 1–1 draw against Evian. Since then, Biševac has formed a central defence partnership with Bakary Koné in the starting XI.

Lazio
On 6 January 2016, Biševac was signed by Serie A club S.S. Lazio on a free transfer.

Metz
On 24 August 2016, Biševac returned to France, agreeing to a two-year contract with Metz.

F91 Dudelange
On 31 July 2018, Biševac moved to Luxembourgish club F91 Dudelange.

Swift Hesperange
Ahead of the 2019/20 season, Biševac joined FC Swift Hesperange.

International career
Biševac won a silver medal with the Serbia and Montenegro national under-21 football team at the 2004 UEFA European Under-21 Championship. Subsequently, he played for the Serbian and Montenegrin 2004 Olympic football team which exited in the first round, finishing fourth in Group C behind gold-medal winners Argentina, Australia and Tunisia.

Biševac made his senior team debut for Serbia in a friendly against Czech Republic, 16 August 2006.

Career statistics

Club

International

Honours

Club
Red Star Belgrade 
First League of Serbia and Montenegro: 2005–06
Serbia and Montenegro Cup: 2005–06

International
Serbia and Montenegro U21
UEFA European Under-21 Championship runner-up: 2004

Individual
Ligue 1 Player of the Month: January 2012

References

External links

 Profile, stats and pictures of Milan Bisevac 
 
 
 

1983 births
Living people
Serbian footballers
Sportspeople from Mitrovica, Kosovo
Kosovo Serbs
Association football defenders
Serbia international footballers
Serbia and Montenegro under-21 international footballers
Olympic footballers of Serbia and Montenegro
Footballers at the 2004 Summer Olympics
FK BASK players
FK Bežanija players
FK Železnik players
Red Star Belgrade footballers
First League of Serbia and Montenegro players
Serbian SuperLiga players
RC Lens players
Valenciennes FC players
Paris Saint-Germain F.C. players
Olympique Lyonnais players
FC Metz players
Ligue 1 players
S.S. Lazio players
Serie A players
F91 Dudelange players
FC Swift Hesperange players
Luxembourg National Division players
Serbian expatriate footballers
Expatriate footballers in France
Expatriate footballers in Italy
Expatriate footballers in Luxembourg